Analytical Center for the Government of the Russian Federation  is the source of prompt expert views on a wide range of socio-economic development issues of the country.

The Analytical Centre under the Government of Russia is a nonprofit federal state institution providing information and analytical support for the Russian Government and performing related research.

The efforts of the Analytical Center are concentrated on providing operational, informational and analytical support; expert support of government’s decisions on major issues of socio-economic development in the areas of finance, transport, industry, utilities, natural resources, environmental protection, education, health, innovation, information technologies, etc. Particular attention is paid to energy, fiscal policy, agriculture and strategic planning, in which the Analytical Center has established itself as a center of expertise.

History

The Analytical Center was established in December 2005 and became the successor of the Working Center for Economic Reforms at the Government of the Russian Federation and the Center for Economic Forecasting at the Government of the Russian Federation. These centers were established in the early 1990s to replace the main computer center of the USSR State Planning Committee, which existed from 1959 to 1991.

The new structure was given the task of making recommendations and proposals on priority issues of economic policy and economic reforms, information-analytical support of the government, examination of concepts and programs for socio-economic development of the country, and short-term forecasting. In accordance with these tasks, the Analytical Center has monitored the implementation of the guidelines and projects of the Government Commission under the President of the Russian Federation on modernization and technological development of the Russian economy since 2008. The center monitors, collects and makes comprehensive analysis of the socio-economic development of the country, with the use of its own information and analytical tools. The center carries out long-term strategic forecasting and analyzes the possible effects of development projects and programs on the development of the country, including the use of international experience.

In 2013 Analytical Center was ranked as the #17 "Think Tank to Watch" in the world by The University of Pennsylvania's Global Go-To Think Tank Index. Compiled by the Think Tank and Civil Societies Program at the University of Pennsylvania, the Global Go-To Think Tank Index is the culmination of an eight-month process involving 6,826 think tanks from 182 countries.

Fields of expertise

Analytical Center provides policy advice on various areas of social and economic life, including:

 Fuel and energy sector
 Energy efficiency
 Financial markets and banking
 Transport economics
 WTO policies
 Metal industry
 Housing and public utilities
 Legal groundwork for land and property regulations
 Use of natural resources, environmental protection and green economy
 Information technologies

Analytical Center also provide expertise regarding draft amendments
to the most important laws of the Russian Federation:

 Federal Law on Arbitration courts
 Federal Law on Stock Market
 Tax Code
 Budget Code
 Criminal Code
 Land Code

totally over 25 bills (draft laws)

Events

 Policy makers, scholars and analysts participate in events to provide expert support for the government decision-making and shaping of the state policy
 Events are result-oriented. Analytical Center produce analytical reports for the Government, recommendations on current policy issues or forecasts on strategic topics
 Anaytical Center hold wide range of events, including workshops, conferences, international forums, presentations, experts breakfasts and debate dinners
 Since the beginning of 2013 the Analytical Center has held 60 events with more than 2000 participants

Key projects

 Developing a path for future development in the global energy market — “Global and Russian Energy Outlook up to 2040”
 Supporting Open Government initiatives
 Monitoring of the Federal Ministries Action Plans
 Supporting strategic governance in regions
 Visualisation of the State Programmes for professionals and open public

International Advisory Network

 An essential part of Analytical Center’s activities is international expert networking which serves to attract high-profile experts to independent policy-relevant research, analysis and discussion, and provision of time-sensitive expert opinion on actual issues.
 International advisory network of Analytical Center includes university alumni, young professionals, scholars and recognized experts and consultants.
 The Analytical Center is establishing partnerships with leading thought centers (universities, think-tanks and other research-oriented institutions) around the world to provide the best intellectual input and support policy making process in Government.

External links
 Official site
 Russian Government official site
 2013 Global Go To Think Tank Index & Abridged Report

Think tanks established in 2005
Think tanks based in Russia
Economy of Russia
2005 establishments in Russia
Organizations based in Moscow
Government of Russia